KRAT (92.1 FM, "Alt 92.1") is a commercial radio station located in Sparks, Nevada, broadcasting to the Reno, Nevada area airing an alternative rock format.  Its studios are located in Reno near the Reno–Tahoe International Airport, with a secondary office in Carson City, and its transmitter is located on Red Hill in North Reno.

History
The station signed on the air in 1993 as KSRN with an easy listening format. In 2000, KSRN moved to a stronger signal at 107.7 FM to cover the Carson City and Lake Tahoe areas. As a result, the 92.1 frequency became home to KJZS with its smooth jazz format. On September 13, 2010, KJZS changed its format to country, branded as "The Wolf", leaving the Reno radio market without a smooth jazz outlet. On November 9, 2010, KJZS changed their call letters to KWFP, to go with the "Wolf" branding. The Evans Broadcast Company, Inc. purchased this station, along with KWPF "The Bandit" in May 2016 from Wilkes Broadcasting. The station joins the "Real" Classic Country Station KCMY AM 1300/102.5 FM Carson City, and 99.1 KKFT.

On August 25, 2018, at midnight, KWFP changed their format from country (which moved to KRFN-HD2 and 95.1) to alternative rock, branded as "Alt 92.1". The station changed its call sign from KWFP to KRAT on September 14, 2018.

Previous logo

References

External links

RAT (FM)
Sparks, Nevada
Modern rock radio stations in the United States
Radio stations established in 1993
1993 establishments in Nevada